San Diego State University Global Campus is one of the several colleges of the San Diego State University, located on the main university campus in San Diego, California.

Academics
SDSU Global Campus, formerly the College of Extended Studies, provides instruction for continuing education programs, including professional development and continuing professional development.

External links
Official website

E
Educational institutions established in 1974
1974 establishments in California